This is a list of members of the 8th Legislative Assembly of Queensland from 1878 to 1883, as elected at the 1878 colonial elections held between 14 November 1878 and 10 December 1878 (due to problems of distance and communications, it was not possible to hold the elections on a single day).

See also
Premier:
 John Douglas (1877–1879)
 Thomas McIlwraith (1879–1883)

Notes
 On 21 January 1879, following the defeat of the Douglas Ministry, the McIlwraith Ministry was sworn in. The Constitution required all of them to stand down and contest their parliamentary seats at ministerial by-elections. Only one of its members was opposed at election: John Malbon Thompson, the member for Ipswich, who was returned by a narrow majority at the poll on 1 February 1879 against James Foote.
 On 3 February 1879, John Deane, the member for Townsville, resigned. John Murtagh Macrossan, who had already been appointed Minister for Works and Mines in the McIlwraith Ministry, won the resulting by-election on 4 March 1879.
 On 1 March 1879, William Fowles, the member for Clermont, resigned following his appointment as Registrar of the Supreme Court. Henry Joseph Weld-Blundell won the resulting by-election on 5 April 1879.
 On 24 March 1879, William Sheffield Paul, the member for Leichhardt, resigned. John MacFarlane won the resulting by-election on 17 April 1879.
 On 3 April 1879, Joshua Peter Bell, the member for Northern Downs, was appointed as President of the Queensland Legislative Council replacing Maurice O'Connell, who had died on 23 March. George Thorn won the resulting by-election on 17 April 1879.
 On 16 May 1879, following a petition upon claims by William Bailey that the Attorney-General and member for Fortitude Valley, Ratcliffe Pring, was engaging in legal services on behalf of the Crown for profit, his seat was vacated and a ministerial by-election announced. Pring was defeated by Frank Beattie at the by-election on 29 May 1879.
 On 24 March 1880, Angus Mackay, member for South Brisbane, retired due to ill health and returned to Britain. Simon Fraser won the resulting by-election on 6 April 1880.
 On 10 April 1880, John MacFarlane, the member for Leichhardt, died. Albrecht Feez won the resulting by-election on 6 May 1880.
 On 4 June 1880, following the resignation of Ratcliffe Pring (who had not held a seat in either house since his defeat on 29 May 1879) as Attorney-General, Henry Beor resigned and contested a ministerial by-election for his seat of Bowen on 29 June 1880, which he won.
 On 26 October 1880, William Hendren, the member for Bundamba, resigned following his being declared insolvent. James Foote won the resulting by-election on 12 November 1880.
 On 24 November 1880, John Douglas, the former Premier and member for Maryborough, resigned. Henry Palmer won the resulting by-election on 13 December 1880.
 On 1 January 1881, George Davenport, the member for Drayton and Toowoomba, died. Robert Aland won the resulting by-election on 14 January 1881.
 On 25 December 1880, Henry Beor, the Attorney-General and member for Bowen, died. Pope Alexander Cooper, who had been appointed his replacement as Attorney-General, won the resulting by-election on 24 January 1881.
 On 30 December 1880, Boyd Dunlop Morehead, the member for Mitchell, was appointed to the Queensland Legislative Council. Oscar de Satge won the resulting by-election on 3 February 1881.
 On 3 January 1881, Francis Amhurst, the member for Mackay, died. Maurice Hume Black won the resulting by-election on 24 March 1881.
 On 27 July 1881, John Malbon Thompson, the member for Ipswich, resigned. Josiah Francis won the resulting by-election on 8 August 1881.
 On 21 September 1881, William Rea, the member for Rockhampton, died. John Ferguson won the resulting by-election on 8 October 1881.
 On 1 November 1881, Francis Kates, the member for Darling Downs, resigned. William Allan won the resulting by-election on 29 November 1881.
 On 24 December 1881, Arthur Hunter Palmer, the member for North Brisbane, was appointed as President of the Queensland Legislative Council, replacing Joshua Peter Bell, who had died on 20 December. William Brookes won the resulting by-election on 13 January 1882.
 On 20 January 1882, George Simpson, the member for Dalby, resigned. John Jessop won the resulting by-election on 31 January 1882.
 On 20 February 1882, Charles Lumley Hill, the member for Gregory, resigned. Thomas McWhannell won the resulting by-election on 21 March 1882.
 On 5 April 1882, Oscar de Satge, the member for Mitchell, resigned. John Govett won the resulting by-election on 27 April 1882.
 On 4 July 1882, Frederick Swanwick, the member for Bulimba, resigned. John Buckland won the resulting by-election on 13 July 1882.
 On 4 July 1882, Archibald Meston, the member for Rosewood, resigned. Jean-Baptiste Isambert won the resulting by-election on 17 July 1882.
 On 5 January 1883, Pope Alexander Cooper, the Attorney-General member for Bowen, resigned. Charles E. Chubb, who had been appointed Attorney-General on 6 January, won the resulting by-election on 18 January 1883.

References

 Waterson, Duncan Bruce: Biographical Register of the Queensland Parliament 1860-1929 (second edition), Sydney 2001.
 Alphabetical Register of Members (Queensland Parliament)
 Brisbane Courier variously over 1878–1883

Members of Queensland parliaments by term
19th-century Australian politicians